The history of Sheffield Wednesday F.C., an English football club from Sheffield, dates back to the club's establishment in 1867. The club would see early regional success followed by a rocky transition to professionalism. Although it has spent the majority of its Football League years in the top flight, its position within the league has varied from the very top to almost slipping to the fourth tier.

The club has won four English League titles, three FA Cups, one League Cup and one FA Community Shield.

The 19th century

The early years
The club was initially a cricket team named The Wednesday Cricket Club after the day of the week on which they played their matches. The footballing side of the club was established to keep the team together and fit during the winter months. SWFC was born on the evening of Wednesday 4 September 1867 at a meeting at the Adelphi Hotel in Sheffield.  The formation was announced two days later with the following statement in the Sheffield Independent newspaper:

SHEFFIELD WEDNESDAY CRICKET CLUB AND FOOTBALL CLUB. – At a general meeting held on Wednesday last, at the Adelphi Hotel, it was decided to form a football club in connection with the above influential cricket club, with the object of keeping together during the winter season the members of this cricket club. From the great unanimity which prevailed as to the desirability of forming the club, there is every reason to expect that it will take first rank. The office bearers were elected as follows: – President, Mr. B. Chatterton; vice-president and treasurer, Mr. F. S. Chambers; hon. Secretary, Mr. Jno. Marsh; assistant, Mr. Castleton. Committee: Messrs Jno. Rodgers, Jno. White, C. Stokes, and H. Bocking. About sixty were enrolled without any canvas, some of them being the best players of the town.

Even at this first meeting it became apparent that football would soon come to eclipse the cricketing side of the club. The formation of the football club came within a decade of the first football club in the world, Sheffield F.C., being formed. Hallam F.C. was set up shortly afterwards and by 1867 Association football was becoming very popular. The Wednesday played their first football match in October 1867 against the Mechanics Club at Norfolk Park, a game which they won by three goals and four rouges to nil.

By 1 February 1868 Wednesday were playing their first competitive football match as they entered the Cromwell Cup, a four-team competition for newly formed clubs sponsored by Oliver Cromwell, the manager of the local Theatre Royal. They went on to win the cup, beating Cromwell's own team, The Garrick Club 1–0 after extra time in the final at Bramall Lane. The match has its own place in history with Wednesday being the scorers in the first recorded instance of a "golden goal" although the term was not used at the time.

Wednesday were joined by the Clegg brothers, Charles and William in 1870. Charles became the club's first international player when he played in the very first international on 30 November 1872. William represented the  Wednesday in the next international on 8 March 1873. Both players would go on to be associated with the club for the rest of their lives. Although it would be Charles who became most heavily involved in football eventually rising to become president and chairman of the Football Association. Both the Cleggs received knighthoods in later life.

In 1876 Wednesday were joined by James Lang. The directors of the club had seen him playing for Glasgow against the Sheffield FA representative side. He was subsequently invited to come to Sheffield and play for the club and given a job, working in a silversmiths owned by one of the directors, which involved no formal duties. This is now acknowledged as the first case of professionalism in the game.

Sheffield's first annual tournament, the Sheffield FA Challenge Cup, was inaugurated in 1876 and won by Wednesday who beat Heeley, their chief rivals at the time, in the final 4–3 after extra time. They would go on to also win the first Wharncliffe Cup in 1879. By this time Wednesday had become the dominant force in local football.

Rocky road to professionalism

In 1879 a number of Wednesday players were involved in a team referred to as The Zulus. The team was set up to raise funds for the families of victims of the Zulu War. They toured the north of England and Scotland but after allegations that the players were being paid, a practice that was illegal at the time, the team was forced to disband by the Sheffield FA in 1882.

In the summer of 1882, after a season in which The Wednesday reached the semifinals of the FA Cup, the cricket and football teams split permanently, and by the end of 1925 the cricket team had disbanded. In the 1880s Wednesday became a permanent fixture in the FA Cup as they attempted to move away from local competitions, however in the 1886–87 season Wednesday did not meet the deadline for entry and a revolt by several of their most skilful players followed.

Several players, all involved in the earlier Zulus controversy, temporarily left the club to play for a local works team which had managed to submit its entry on time. Later in the season the same players threatened to walk out permanently and set up a professional club called Sheffield Rovers. Wednesday's President at the time, John Holmes, was against the club turning professional, but under the immense pressure of the possibility of losing his star players he entered into talks with the rebels, eventually offering professional terms. At the meeting called to set up Sheffield Rovers, one of the rebel players, Tom Cawley, argued that Wednesday should be given one final chance and the football club duly turned professional on 22 April 1887. The initial wages were five shillings for home fixtures and seven shillings and sixpence for away games.

The Olive Grove years

The move to professionalism led to the team building their own stadium rather than playing at venues such as Bramall Lane or Sheaf House whose owners took a share of the "gate". They leased some land by the railway tracks near Queen's Road from the Duke of Norfolk  and in 1887 built the Olive Grove ground. They named it so because an olive farm was bulldozed in order to build it

In 1889, when their first application to join the Football League was rejected, the club became founder members of the Football Alliance of which they were the first champions in a season that they also reached the 1890 FA Cup Final, losing 6–1 to Blackburn Rovers at The Oval. They finished the following season bottom of the Alliance but recovered to finish in fourth place in the final Alliance season. The following season they were elected to Division 1 of the Football League when it was increased from 14 to 16 clubs, topping the poll with 10 votes. They won the FA Cup in 1896, beating Wolverhampton Wanderers by a 2–1 scoreline at Crystal Palace.

The 20th century

Pre-war success
In a strong decade Wednesday won the league twice in the 1902–03 and 1903–04 seasons and the FA Cup again in 1907, beating Everton, again at Crystal Palace by two goals to one. After this a relatively fallow period was to be suffered for another two decades.

In 1929 the club officially changed its name from The Wednesday Football Club to Sheffield Wednesday Football Club under the stewardship of manager Robert Brown. However the name Sheffield Wednesday dates back as far as 1883: the former ground at Olive Grove had the name Sheffield Wednesday painted on the stand roof.

The team rose to the top of English football once again in the 1928–29 season. They had almost been relegated in the previous season but with 17 points in the last 10 matches the team pulled off the great escape, rising from bottom to 14th. Consecutive titles in the next two seasons started a run that would see the team finishing lower than third only once until 1935. The period was topped off with the team winning the FA cup for the third time in the club's history in 1935 under manager Billy Walker.

Post-war turmoil
The 50s saw Wednesday unable to consistently hold on to a position in the top flight. After being promoted back up in 1950, they were relegated a total of three times. Each time would see them bounce back up by winning the Second Division the following season. The decade ended on a high note with the team finally finishing in the top half of the First Division for the first time since World War 2. In 1958, they were the first team to play Manchester United after the Munich Air Disaster, an FA cup tie, which they lost 0–3.

This led to a decade of successfully remaining in the First Division, which included a cup run to the FA cup final in 1966. Off the field the club was embroiled in the British betting scandal of 1964 where three of their players, Peter Swan, David Layne and Tony Kay, were accused of match fixing and betting against their own team. The three were subsequently convicted and, on release from prison, banned from football for life.

Wednesday were relegated at the end of the 1969–70 season, starting arguably the darkest period in the club's history. After going into freefall they spent 5 seasons in the Third Division and the club almost suffered relegation to the Fourth Division in 1976, but a revival over the next few seasons under first, Jack Charlton and then, Howard Wilkinson, saw them reach the First Division in 1984.

The 1980s: Resurgence
Under the management of Wilkinson, Sheffield Wednesday won promotion to the First Division at the end of the 1983–84 season and would remain at this level for all but one of the next sixteen seasons. They finished fifth in the league at the end of the 1985–86 season and only missed out on a UEFA Cup place because English teams were banned from European competitions due to the Heysel Stadium disaster at this time.

Wednesday's lack of ambition at that time resulted in Wilkinson leaving in September 1988 to take charge of Leeds United who were a Second Division club at the time. Within four seasons, he had taken them to the league title. No English manager has won the top English division since.

Meanwhile, Sheffield Wednesday replaced Wilkinson with his former assistant Peter Eustace in what proved to be a disastrous appointment. He was at the helm for just four months before being sacked to make way for former West Bromwich Albion manager Ron Atkinson, who had lifted two FA Cups with Manchester United.

Wednesday's on field woes paled into insignificance in April 1989 when 97 Liverpool supporters were unlawfully killed in a crush at the Leppings Lane end of the ground in an FA Cup semi-final hosted by the club. The Hillsborough disaster remains an indelible stain on the club's history and to this day is a source of deep shame for older supporters.

The 1990s: Life at the top

Under the stewardship of chairman Dave Richards, the 1990s were to become the most successful and exciting period in Wednesday's history since the 1930s. 

In Atkinson's first full season as manager, 1989–90, Sheffield Wednesday finished 18th in the First Division and were relegated on goal difference, despite the acquisition of the talented John Sheridan and the fact they had pulled towards mid-table at one stage of the season. They regained promotion at the first attempt but the real highlight of the season was a League Cup final victory over Atkinson's old club Manchester United. Midfielder Sheridan scored the only goal of the game, which delivered the club's first major trophy since their FA Cup success of 1935. Atkinson moved to Aston Villa shortly after promotion was achieved, and handed over the reins to 37-year-old striker Trevor Francis.

Wednesday finished third in the First Division at the end of the 1991–92 season, booking their place in the following season's UEFA Cup and becoming a founder member of the new FA Premier League.

1992–93 was one of the most eventful seasons in the history of Sheffield Wednesday football club. They finished seventh in the Premier League and reached the finals of both the FA Cup and the League Cup, but were on the losing side to Arsenal in both games, the FA Cup final going to a replay and only settled in the last minute of extra time. This prevented the Owls from making another appearance in European competition. Still, the 1992–93 season established Sheffield Wednesday as a top club. Midfielder Chris Waddle was voted Football Writers' Association Footballer of the Year, and the strike partnership of David Hirst and Mark Bright was one of the most feared in the country. Francis was unable to achieve further success at the club, and two seasons later he was sacked, despite the club never having finished lower than 13th during his tenure. His successor was former Luton, Leicester and Tottenham manager David Pleat.

David Pleat's first season as Sheffield Wednesday manager was frustrating, as they finished 15th in the Premiership despite an expensively-assembled line-up which included the likes of Marc Degryse, Dejan Stefanovic and Darko Kovacevic – who all had disappointing and short-lived tenures at the club. An excellent start to the 1996–97 season saw the Owls top the Premiership after winning their first four games, and David Pleat was credited Manager of the Month for August 1996. But the club failed to mount a serious title challenge and they faded away to finish seventh in the final table. Pleat was sacked the following November with the club struggling at the wrong end of the Premiership, and Ron Atkinson briefly returned to steer the Owls clear of relegation.

At the end of the 1997–98 season, Ron Atkinson's short-term contract was not renewed and Sheffield Wednesday turned to the Barnsley boss Danny Wilson as their new manager after being given the backword by both Gerard Houllier and Walter Smith who joined Liverpool and Everton respectively. Wilson's first season at the helm brought a slight improvement as they finished 12th in the Premiership. An expensively assembled squad including Paolo Di Canio, Benito Carbone and Wim Jonk failed to live up to its massive wage bill and things eventually came to a head when Italian firebrand Di Canio was sent off in a match against Arsenal and proceeded to push the referee to the ground on his way off, resulting in an eleven match ban from which he never returned. Danny Wilson was sacked the following March with relegation looking a certainty for the Hillsborough club, following a disastrous season where they had been hammered 8-0 by Newcastle United as early as September. His assistant Peter Shreeves took temporary charge but was unable to stave off relegation.

The 21st century

Relegation to League One
Peter Shreeves remained at Sheffield Wednesday for the 2000–01 season as assistant to their new manager Paul Jewell. But Jewell was unable to mount a promotion challenge and he was sacked the following February with the Owls hovering just above the Division One relegation zone. Shreeves was given a permanent contract to take charge of the first team and he guided them to a 17th-place finish. After another bad start in 2001–02, he handed the reins over to assistant Terry Yorath. Wednesday finished just two places above the Division One relegation zone and the only bright spot of the season was a run to the semifinals of the League Cup.

Yorath resigned in October 2002 after Wednesday made a terrible start to the 2002–03 season, and in came Hartlepool manager Chris Turner – a former Owls goalkeeper – as his successor. Turner made a big effort to rejuvenate the side and there were some impressive results during the final weeks of the season, but a failure to beat Brighton in the penultimate game of the season condemned them to relegation.

Before the start of season 2003–04, local nightclub and casino owner, Dave Allen swapped his directorship role with Geoff Hulley to become chairman. Turner was optimistic of an immediate return to Division One, but this was not to be. Wednesday finished 2003–04 in 16th place in Division Two, with the lowest goals tally in the division (48). It was the lowest ebb of the club's history, rivalled only by the 1975–76 season, where Wednesday finished in 20th place in the same division with the same number of points as in the 2003–04 season. Turner was sacked after a poor start to the 2004–05 Coca-Cola League One campaign, and replaced by former Plymouth and Southampton manager Paul Sturrock.

Return to the Championship

Sturrock revitalised Sheffield Wednesday's fortunes and they finished fifth in League One at the end of the 2004–05 season, qualifying for the promotion playoffs. They defeated Brentford 3–1 on aggregate in the semifinals, moving them into the playoff final on 29 May 2005 at the Millennium Stadium. 41,000 Wednesdayites descended on Cardiff for what was the biggest game in twelve years for the club. They weren't to be disappointed as the Owls took a 1–0 lead through Jon-Paul McGovern on the stroke of halftime. However, Hartlepool fought back and took a 2–1 lead with 20 minutes of the game remaining. Sturrock made a brave triple substitution bringing on 18-year-old striker Drew Talbot and the Owls' top scorer of the season, Steve MacLean (who had been out injured for the previous three months and had not kicked a ball). They combined with 10 minutes left as the Owls levelled the game 2–2. Talbot was adjudged to have been pushed down inside the box and Sheffield Wednesday were awarded a controversial penalty, which also resulted in the dismissal of Hartlepool player Westwood. MacLean duly slotted home the resultant penalty. They went on to win 4–2 after extra time, goals from Glenn Whelan and Drew Talbot, achieving promotion to the Championship.

On 17 April 2006, Sheffield Wednesday retained their place in the Championship with two matches remaining, with a 2–0 away win at Brighton, condemning Brighton, Millwall and Crewe to the drop in the process. Wednesday went on to finish the season in 19th place, 10 points clear of the relegation zone. They were statistically the best supported team in the Championship; their average home league attendance of 24,853 marginally beat newly relegated Norwich with 24,833.

Brian Laws and Alan Irvine

Despite having been awarded a new four-year contract just five weeks earlier, Sturrock was sacked after a slow start to the 2006–07 season. His replacement was the former Scunthorpe United boss Brian Laws. Wednesday finished the season ninth in the Football League Championship, just four points short of the playoffs.

On 25 June 2007, the River Don burst its bank during a period of severe weather in the area, and the whole ground was flooded with several feet of water. The changing rooms, restaurants and kitchens and boardroom were all flooded, as well as the shop; many local houses were also affected.  The club and ground remained closed for the rest of June.  On 6 July, the club issued a statement confirming that the pitch would be ready in time for a pre-season friendly match against Birmingham City on 4 August.

A disastrous start of six consecutive league defeats meant the club spent the 2007–08 season battling against relegation and went into the final match of the season against Norwich City knowing that defeat could send them down. After conceding first, a 4–1 victory in front of 36,208 spectators brought much needed relief. This was the Football League's highest attendance of the season and provided a fitting stage for Dion Dublin's final game. He received a standing ovation from all parts of the ground when substituted in the 66th minute.

Season 2008–09 saw Wednesday's first Sheffield derby win double in 95 years and a mid-table finish brought fresh hope for the coming season. But after a run of poor results, Laws left the club by mutual consent in December 2009. He was replaced in January by the former Preston North End boss Alan Irvine. Irvine won the January Championship Manager of the Month award, but the form was not sustained and the club was relegated after failing to beat Crystal Palace in front of 37,121 on the final day of the season.

Change of ownership structure

The relegation triggered the resignation of chairman Lee Strafford. Stepping into the breach was former Wednesday player and manager Howard Wilkinson, making it clear that this would be an interim measure. 
In July and September 2010 winding up petitions instigated by HMRC were successfully fought off but in November 2010 a third winding up order threatened the club's existence. The High Court's patience was clearly wearing thin but CEO Nick Parker succeeded in securing a stay of execution after Deputy Prime Minister and Sheffield Hallam MP, Nick Clegg, helped persuade the club's main creditor, the Co-operative Bank, to grant more time to find a buyer.
Shortly afterwards, Leicester City chairman Milan Mandarić agreed to purchase the club. The purchase was completed the following month after an Extraordinary General Meeting of Wednesday's shareholders during which 99.7% of shareholders voted to sell the company to Mandarić's UK Football Investments for £1. Mandarić agreed to settle the club's outstanding debts as part of the deal and stepped down as chairman of Leicester City. For the first time in the club's history, the whole of the share base was now controlled by a single entity.

The Milan Mandarić Era

On the field, the club was failing to make its mark in League One and Irvine was replaced by Gary Megson, son of former Owls captain Don Megson, and twice previously a player for the club. Megson failed to salvage the season and the club ended in a disappointing 15th place, lower than when he had taken over.

Season 2011–12 marked the start of a change in the club's fortunes but, after a late dip in form, Megson was controversially replaced by former Cardiff City manager Dave Jones despite having just led Wednesday to what proved to be a season defining Sheffield derby win and with the club lying in third place. Jones carried on Megson's good work and completed the season unbeaten with ten wins and two draws, picking up two consecutive League One Manager of the Month awards. The final match of the season against Wycombe Wanderers attracted 38,082 spectators to Hillsborough to watch Wednesday achieve the victory needed to finish second in the division, clinching promotion at the expense of local rivals Sheffield United who subsequently lost an epic penalty shoot-out in the promotion playoff final to Huddersfield Town at Wembley.

With one of the lowest playing budgets in the Championship, 2012–13 season was one of survival and, with judicious loan signings, Jones steered the club to an 18th-place finish in one of the toughest Championship seasons in history with fourth bottom club Barnsley needing 55 points to survive.

With no appreciable improvement in the budget, 2013–14 season was again proving to be a struggle and, with only one league win and the club second bottom, Jones was sacked at the start of December. Coach Stuart Gray was named caretaker manager and, after a good run of results, was finally given the job permanently. The length of contract remained confidential and, with a departure from club tradition, Gray was given the job title of head coach. For the third consecutive season Wednesday finished in a higher league position than the previous season.

Season 2014–15 was preceded by a story in the French newspaper, L'Equipe, of the imminent takeover of Wednesday by Hafiz Mammadov, an Azerbaijani industrialist and effective owner of RC Lens. With the Sheffield public hungry for news, Mandarić, perhaps unwisely, confirmed the takeover before its completion and announced a shirt sponsorship deal with the supposed new ownership. Mammadov subsequently failed to fulfil his legal obligations within the terms of the takeover agreement and Mandarić called time on the deal, instructing the club's lawyers accordingly. Embarrassingly, shirts had already been sold with the logo 'Azerbaijan Land of Fire' and the club decided to continue with the shirt sponsorship deal for the season, insisting that the deal was independent of the failed takeover.

Enter Dejphon Chansiri

On 29 January 2015 the club announced that an agreement had been reached between Mr Mandarić's UKFI Limited and Thai businessman Mr Dejphon Chansiri to acquire 100% of the club's shareholding. At a press conference on 2 March 2015 Mr Chansiri, whose family has a controlling interest in the Thai Union Frozen Group, announced that he had purchased the club for £37.5m and was aiming for promotion to the Premier League by 2017, the club's 150th anniversary.

Season 2014–15 ended with the club improving its league position for the fourth consecutive season despite a very poor home campaign in which only 16 league goals were scored. The final home game of the season saw a wretched defeat at the hands of Yorkshire rivals Leeds United, contrasting sharply with the previous season's 6–0 victory. Many felt that the home form was the catalyst for Stuart Gray's departure from the club in June 2015 and the appointment of Carlos Carvalhal, a widely travelled but largely unknown Portuguese coach. Carvalhal became Wednesday's first ever overseas manager/coach.

After a patchy start, season 2015–16 culminated in a creditable 6th-place finish which represented a fifth consecutive improvement in league position. Wednesday somewhat luckily defeated the playoff favourites Brighton & Hove Albion in the two legged semi-final but suffered a 1–0 defeat at the hands of Yorkshire rivals Hull City in the final, the club's first visit to the new Wembley.

Season 2016–17 ended in disappointment despite Wednesday improving their league position for the sixth consecutive season. Defeat in the playoffs at the semifinal stage by eventual winners Huddersfield Town signalled criticism in some quarters of the marked change in playing style from the previous season. After much confusion over Carlos Carvalhal's future due to conflicting press reports it was announced that he would remain in charge for the coming season although the length of his contract was not disclosed.

A disappointing start to season 2017–18 led to Carlos Carvalhal leaving the club on Christmas Eve, reviving painful memories of Derek Dooley's departure 44 years earlier. Carvalhal's replacement was Jos Luhukay, a Dutchman of Indonesian heritage who had achieved three promotions in Germany. His first match in charge was a derby at Bramall Lane against high flying Sheffield United, but against all expectations and despite having a man sent off, the team achieved its first clean sheet of the season.

Results were mixed under Luhukay and in season 2018–19, after a particularly poor run, he was sacked in December. His replacement was the experienced Steve Bruce with four promotions to the Premier League as manager under his belt. After Wednesday agreed to allow Bruce to conclude a family holiday, he eventually took over the reins in February 2019 after sterling work by Lee Bullen as caretaker, his second spell in the role. This time, Bruce's job title was team manager, a welcome change which hinted at more control over signings than that enjoyed by his immediate predecessors. Wednesday finished the season strongly and the new season was keenly anticipated, but the club was rocked by the resignation of Bruce and his coaching staff days before its start.

Yet again, Bullen successfully stepped into the breach as caretaker, and former Swansea City and Birmingham City manager, Garry Monk was next to take the hot seat in September 2019. Wednesday entered the second half of season 2019–20 in the play-off positions but facing a possible points deduction after being charged by the EFL with financial irregularities over the purchase of the stadium by Mr Chansiri. The club's form dipped significantly as 2020 progressed, with only 2 wins in 14 games before the suspension of the season in March 2020, due to the ongoing coronavirus pandemic. The season restarted in June, and the team's form didn't improve, with Wednesday losing 5 of their last 7 games to finish a disappointing 16th, down from 3rd on Christmas Day.

The threat of the points deduction hanging over the club finally materialised, as on 31 July 2020, the EFL stated that the club would start the upcoming 2020–21 season with a 12 point deficit. This was later reduced on appeal to 6 points on 4 November but with the club still second bottom of the division, Garry Monk was sacked on 9 November and replaced by the former Stoke City manager, Welshman Tony Pulis, five days later. After only ten games in charge, Pulis was replaced by the Doncaster Rovers manager Darren Moore on 1 March, 2021. However, the 6 points deduction proved decisive, and Wednesday were relegated to League One after failing to beat Derby County on the last day of the season.

Despite a mixed start, a strong second half to the 2021-22 season saw Moore guide the Owls to the League One playoffs only to be eliminated by Sunderland who went on to secure promotion to the Championship after a four year absence.

References

Sheffield Wednesday F.C.
Sheffield Wednesday F.C.
Sheffield Wednesday F.C.